Laniše (in older sources also Lanišče) is a dispersed settlement in the hills west of Gorenja Vas in the Municipality of Gorenja Vas–Poljane on the western edge of the Upper Carniola region of Slovenia.

References

External links

Laniše on Geopedia

Populated places in the Municipality of Gorenja vas-Poljane